Andreu is a common Catalan and southern French given name of Ancient Greek origin, which also appears as a surname. The word Andreu is derived etymologically from the ancient Greek vocabulary word andros, the genitive of aner ("man") and so means "of the man". Thus, the name Andreu takes the meaning the one who is "manly", "strong", "courageous" or a "warrior". The contemporary Greek equivalent of the name is Andreou; the English equivalent is Andrew.

Notable people with the name include:

Given name
 Andreu Blanes (born 1991), Spanish orienteering competitor
 Andreu Buenafuente (born 1955), Spanish late night show host and founder of the group El Terrat
 Andreu Canals (born 1973), Spanish rower
 Andreu Febrer (1375–1440), Spanish poet and diplomat
 Andreu Fontàs (born 1989), Catalan football player for the FC Barcelona
 Andreu Guerao (born 1983), Spanish footballer
 Andreu Ivars, Valencian Franciscan priest and historian
 Andreu Jacob (born 1971), Catalan composer
 Andreu Lacondeguy (born 1989), freeride Mountain biker
 Andreu Linares (born 1975), Spanish futsal player
 Andreu Martín (born 1949), Spanish author
 Andreu Mas-Colell (born 1944), Catalan economist
 Andreu Matos (born 1995), Andorran footballer
 Andreu Nin, Spanish politician
 Andreu Veà Baró (born 1969), Catalan Internet Pioneer; The Internet Biographer
 Andreu Vivó (1978–2012), Spanish male artistic gymnast

Surname
 Antonio Andreu (born 1947), Spanish handballer
 Blanca Andreu (born 1959), Spanish poet
 Christian Andreu (born 1976), French musician
 Concha Andreu (born 1967), Spanish oenologist and politician
 Enrique Andreu (born 1967), Spanish basketball player
 Etelvina Andreu (born 1969), politician
 Fernando Andreu, Spanish judge
 Frankie Andreu (born 1966), American cyclist
 Gabriela Velasco Andreu (born 1985), Spanish tennis player
 Gogó Andreu (1919–2012), Argentine actor, comedian, and musician
 Guillemette Andreu (born 1948), French Egyptologist and archaeologist
 Juan Alberto Andreu, a Spanish football/soccer player
 Juan Andreu (born 1985), Spanish handballer
 Maite Andreu (born 1971), Spanish handballer
 Marc Andreu (born 1985), French rugby union player
 Maria Andreu (1801–?), first US Coastguard female employee
 Mariano Andreu (1888–1976), Spanish painter
 Marta Vilajosana Andreu (born 1975), Spanish road bicycle racer
 Paul Andreu (1938–2018), French architect
 Pedro Andreu, Spanish musician
 Pierre Andreu (1909–1987), French journalist, essayist, biographer, and poet
 Reineri Andreu (born 1998), Cuban freestyle wrestler
 Rosaura Andreu (1922–2010), Cuban actress
 Simón Andreu (born 1941), Spanish actor
 Tono Andreu (1915–1981), Argentine film actor
 Tony Andreu (born 1988), French footballer
 Vanessa Andreu (born 1979), Mexican actress, singer, hostess, and reporter
 Yoann Andreu (born 1989), French footballer
 Aaron Andreu (born 1979), American singer/songwriter

See also 
 Andrzej
 Jędrzej
 Sant Andreu

Catalan masculine given names
Catalan-language surnames
Surnames from given names

de:Andreu